The 1977 Calder Cup playoffs of the American Hockey League began on April 3, 1977. The top four teams in the league qualified for the playoffs and played best-of-seven series for Semifinals. The two winners played a best-of-seven series for the Calder Cup.  The Calder Cup Final ended on April 30, 1977, with the Nova Scotia Voyageurs defeating the Rochester Americans four games to two to win the Calder Cup for second consecutive year, and the third time in team history. For the second consecutive year, the Voyageurs parent club, the Montreal Canadiens won the Stanley Cup in a four-game sweep over the Boston Bruins, making them the only pair of teams in history to win both the AHL's Calder Cup and NHL's Stanley Cup in the same season twice.

Playoff seeds
After the 1976–77 AHL regular season, the top four teams in the league qualified for the playoffs. The Nova Scotia Voyageurs finished the regular season with the best overall record for the second straight season.

Overall
Nova Scotia Voyageurs - 110 points
New Haven Nighthawks - 92 points
Rochester Americans - 89 points
Hershey Bears - 78 points

Bracket

In each round, the team that earned more points during the regular season receives home ice advantage, meaning they receive the "extra" game on home-ice if the series reaches the maximum number of games. There is no set series format due to arena scheduling conflicts and travel considerations.

Semifinals
Note 1: Home team is listed first.
Note 2: The number of overtime periods played (where applicable) is not indicated.

(1) Nova Scotia Voyageurs vs. (4) Hershey Bears

(2) New Haven Nighthawks vs. (3) Rochester Americans

Calder Cup Final

(1) Nova Scotia Voyageurs vs. (3) Rochester Americans

See also
1976–77 AHL season
List of AHL seasons

References

Calder Cup
Calder Cup playoffs